The 1979 Individual Ice Speedway World Championship was the 14th edition of the World Championship  The Championship was held on 4/5 March 1979 in Inzell, Germany.

The winner was Anatoly Bondarenko of the Soviet Union.

Classification

See also 
 1979 Team Ice Racing World Championship
 1979 Individual Speedway World Championship in classic speedway

References 

Ice speedway competitions
World